The Nomer Tamid Synagogue of Białystok (also known as the Nomer Tamid Beth Midrash; ;  [Synagogue of the Eternal Flame]) was a wooden synagogue in Białystok built in 1703 or 1711. Funding for the building was provided by Jan Klemens Branicki. It was located on Bóżniczej Street, across from the Old Synagogue and the Great Synagogue. The synagogue was destroyed during World War II.

Gallery

Former synagogues in Poland
Jews and Judaism in Białystok
Synagogues in Poland
Buildings and structures in Białystok
Synagogues in Poland destroyed by Nazi Germany
Orthodox synagogues in Poland